Chercher (Amharic: ጨርጨር) sometimes spelled as Charchar was a former province in Eastern Ethiopia in what is now eastern Oromia. Also known as Ahmar and West Hararghe, chercher is the name given mainly to the eastern escarpment highland areas of Oromia state's West Hararaghe Zone, where the chains of Checher or Ahmar mountains rise and extend inland from the Great Rift Valley in its northwest. The capital of the former Chercher province was Chiro.

Etymology 
Chercher may originate from carcar, the Harari language meaning ridge that leads to a ravine.

History 
In the year 1923 regent Ras Tafari appointed Fit′awrari Tekle Hawariat Tekle Mariyam as governor of Chercher, a year later governor Tekle Hawariat founded the town of Chiro (known then under its old name Asebe Tafari.) and the new capital of the province. Later the Chercher province merged into Hararghe province.

References

History of Ethiopia
Provinces of Ethiopia